María Asunción "Mariasun" Quiñones Goikoetxea (born 29 October 1996) is a Spanish professional footballer who plays as a goalkeeper for Liga F club Athletic Bilbao and the Spain women's national team.

Career
She began her career with local club Mariño (Irun), moving to Real Sociedad in 2014 at the age of 18, where she soon became the regular starting goalkeeper ahead of Cris Cornejo. She transferred to Athletic in the summer of 2021, along with club teammate Itxaso Uriarte.

Quiñones made her senior international debut for Spain in 2017. She was involved in several squads, including for the UEFA Women's Euro 2017 and the 2019 FIFA Women's World Cup without making an appearance at either tournament.

Her twin sister Nekane is also a footballer, playing in midfield for teams playing at regional levels including Oiartzun and Añorga.

Honours
 Real Sociedad
Copa de la Reina: 2019

Spain
 Algarve Cup: 2017
 Cyprus Cup: 2018

References

External links
 
 
 
 
 
 

1996 births
Living people
Footballers from the Basque Country (autonomous community)
Spanish women's footballers
Primera División (women) players
Women's association football goalkeepers
People from Hondarribia
Real Sociedad (women) players
Spain women's international footballers
Sportspeople from Gipuzkoa
2019 FIFA Women's World Cup players
Twin sportspeople
Spanish twins
Athletic Club Femenino players
UEFA Women's Euro 2017 players
Spain women's youth international footballers
21st-century Spanish women